Bayramlı (also, Bayramly and Bajramly) is a village and municipality in the Shamkir Rayon of Azerbaijan.  It has a population of 2,671. 
15 kilometers from the center of the region.

The history
At the village there are ancient city built «Baydar», relating to the period of 11th - 12th century.

Population
The vast population are Azerbaijanis.

Notable people
Hasanova Gulkhar Ibrahim qizi  (born 10 December 1918)  - People's Artist of Azerbaijan.

References 

Populated places in Shamkir District